Gettings Creek is a tributary of the  Coast Fork Willamette River in Lane County, in the U.S. state of Oregon. Flowing generally west from near Prune Hill, it turns sharply north as it nears Interstate 5 (I-5). It enters the larger stream near Walker, between Cottage Grove to the south and Creswell to the north. The I-5 rest area called Gettings Creek lies next to the creek.

The creek and a tributary, North Fork Gettings Creek, were named for Samuel A. Gettings, an early settler. Gettings lived near the creek in 1888.

See also
List of rivers of Oregon

References

Rivers of Lane County, Oregon
Rivers of Oregon